A picket boat is a type of small naval craft. These are used for harbor patrol and other close inshore work, and have often been carried by larger warships as a ship's boat. They usually 30 to 55 feet long.

Patrol boats, or any craft engaged in sentinel duty, are sometimes referred to as picket boats, using "picket" in the generic sense, even if much larger than actual picket boats.

United States

(Although named "Picket Boat", this craft has also been called a steam launch). The boat was armed with a 12-pounder Dahlgren gun and a spar torpedo, of which the latter was employed in sinking Albemarle. The Union's Potomac Flotilla also employed some picket boats.

In the early 1920s, during Prohibition, the United States Coast Guard built a fleet of 103 picket boats to intercept rum runners, supplementing the larger and more seaworthy cutters and patrol boats.

Britain

A long-serving 19th-century British picket boat, carried on capital ships, was a  model introduced in 1867 which saw wide service in World War I and even some limited service in World War II. The typical main armament during most of this boat's service life was a Hotchkiss 3–pounder, adopted by the Royal Navy in 1886.

The P1000 Class Picket Boat is a current British Royal Navy boat,  in length, formerly carried on destroyers but now used only for training.

Germany

The Königsberg–class cruisers of 1905 and 1915 carried a picket boat; the Königsbergs of 1927 carried two. The Dresden class of a similar era carried one, as did the Wiesbaden–class.

Larger ships also carried picket boats: The Nassau–, König–, and Bayern–class battleships, the SMS Seydlitz, and the Derfflinger–class battlecruisers all carried one each.

See also
Launch, a type which overlaps somewhat with picket boats
 Radar picket, a larger ship or submarine, used to extend the range of radar coverage.
Crash boats of World War 2
Wooden boats of World War 2

References

Military boats